Tollefsen is a Norwegian surname which may refer to:

Astrid Tollefsen (1897–1973), Norwegian lyricist
Mark Tollefsen (born 1992), American basketball player
Ole-Kristian Tollefsen, Norwegian ice hockey player 
Signe Tollefsen, American-Dutch singer-songwriter 
Tollef Tollefsen (1885–1963), Norwegian rower

Norwegian-language surnames